Andreina del Valle Pinto Pérez (born 10 September 1991) is an Olympic and National Record holding swimmer from Venezuela. She swam for Venezuela at the 2008 Olympics.

She also swam at the:
2007 World Championships
2007 Pan American Games
2008 Open Water Worlds
2009 World Championships
2010 Central American and Caribbean Games

At the 2009 World Championships, she swam to new Venezuelan Records in the 200, 400, and 1500 free (2:02.15, 4:11.29, and 16:22.29). The 200 free record came in leading off Venezuela's 4x200 Free Relay, which also lowered the national record.

At the 2008 Olympics, she set the Venezuelan Record in the 800 free at 8:30.30; and she also holds the national mark in the 200 fly (2:14.74).

Pinto was named the flag bearer for the Venezuela delegation at the 2011 Pan American Games.

References

External links
 
 
 
 

Living people
1991 births
Sportspeople from Maracay
Venezuelan female swimmers
Olympic swimmers of Venezuela
Swimmers at the 2008 Summer Olympics
Swimmers at the 2012 Summer Olympics
Swimmers at the 2016 Summer Olympics
Swimmers at the 2007 Pan American Games
Swimmers at the 2011 Pan American Games
Swimmers at the 2015 Pan American Games
Pan American Games silver medalists for Venezuela
Pan American Games bronze medalists for Venezuela
Pan American Games medalists in swimming
Central American and Caribbean Games gold medalists for Venezuela
Central American and Caribbean Games silver medalists for Venezuela
Central American and Caribbean Games bronze medalists for Venezuela
Competitors at the 2006 Central American and Caribbean Games
Competitors at the 2010 Central American and Caribbean Games
Competitors at the 2014 Central American and Caribbean Games
South American Games gold medalists for Venezuela
South American Games silver medalists for Venezuela
South American Games bronze medalists for Venezuela
South American Games medalists in swimming
Competitors at the 2006 South American Games
Competitors at the 2010 South American Games
Competitors at the 2014 South American Games
Central American and Caribbean Games medalists in swimming
Medalists at the 2011 Pan American Games
Medalists at the 2015 Pan American Games
20th-century Venezuelan women
21st-century Venezuelan women